Walid Dahrouj (born 1965) is a Lebanese former footballer who played as striker. He played nearly 20 years for Safa, and represented Lebanon internationally.

Club career
Dahrouj started his career at Ahli Saida, before moving to Safa in 1984. In 1991–92 he was Lebanese Premier League top goalscorer with 20 goals. Dahrouj remained at Safa until his retirement in 2002.

International career 
Dahrouj represented Lebanon internationally during the 1990s, playing at the 1994 FIFA World Cup qualifiers and the 1998 Arab Nations Cup.

Personal life
Born in 1965, Dahrouj has two daughters: Majida (born 2002), named after his mother, and May (born 2006/2007). He is a supporter of Spanish club Real Madrid.

As of 2015, Dahrouj was working at the duty-free shop of the Beirut–Rafic Hariri International Airport and living in his hometown Shheem.

Honours 
Safa
 Lebanese FA Cup: 1986–87; runner-up: 1970–71, 1989–90, 1990–91, 1994–95, 1999–2000

Individual
 Lebanese Premier League top goalscorer: 1991–92

References

External links
 
 

1965 births
Living people
People from Chouf District
Lebanese footballers
Association football forwards
Al Ahli Saida SC players
Safa SC players
Lebanese Premier League players
Lebanon international footballers